Cinquecento is a Vienna based vocal ensemble formed in 2004 comprising five singers from Austria, Belgium, England, Germany and Switzerland.

Discography
Music for the Court of Maximilian II (Hyperion Records,  CDA67579, 2007)
Jacob Regnart: Missa Super Oeniades Nymphae & other sacred music (Hyperion Records,  CDA67640, 2007)
Philippe de Monte: Missa Ultimi miei sospiri (Hyperion Records,  CDA67658, 2008)
Jacobus Vaet: Missa Ego flos campi & other sacred music (Hyperion Records,  CDA67733, 2009)
Philipp Schoendorff: The Complete Works (Hyperion Records,  CDA67854, 2011)
Adrian Willaert: Missa Mente tota & Motets (Hyperion Records,  CDA67749, 2010)
Richafort: Requiem & other sacred music (Hyperion Records,  CDA67959, 2012)
Jean Guyot Amorosi Peniseiri (Hyperion Records,  CDA68053, 2014)
Orlande de Lassus: Missa super Dixit Joseph & motets (Hyperion Records,  CDA68064, 2015)
Jean Guyot Te Deum laudamus & other sacred music (Hyperion Records,  CDA68180, 2017)

References

Early music groups